Gimson is a surname which may refer to:

John Gimson (1983), Olympic silver Medalist
Alfred C. Gimson (1917–1985), English phonetician
Andrew Gimson (born 1958), British political journalist and writer
Christopher Gimson (1886–1975), English cricketer and colonial administrator
Ernest Gimson (1864–1919), English furniture designer and architect
Sir Franklin Gimson (1890–1975), British colonial administrator in Ceylon, Hong Kong and Singapore
Robert Gimson (born 1986), former American football running back
Sally Gimson, British Labour Party politician
Samson Gimson (born 1964), Singaporean professional golfer

See also
Gimson (cycles), Catalan bicycle and motorcycle brand
Gimson and Company, British steam engine manufacturer
Grimson, surname